Haina (Kloster) is a municipality in Waldeck-Frankenberg in northwest Hesse, Germany.

Geography

Location
Haina lies in Waldeck-Frankenberg south of Frankenberg and east of Burgwald at the southwest slope of the Kellerwald range. It lies on the river Wohra not far west of the Hohes Lohr (the Kellerwald range's second highest peak at 657 m).

Neighbouring communities
Haina borders in the northwest on the town of Frankenau, in the northeast on the town of Bad Wildungen (both in Waldeck-Frankenberg), in the east on the community of Bad Zwesten, in the southeast on the communities of Jesberg and Gilserberg (all three in the Schwalm-Eder-Kreis), in the south on the town of Gemünden, and in the west on the community of Burgwald and the town of Frankenberg (all three in Waldeck-Frankenberg).

Constituent communities

Haina consists of the following 12 centres: Altenhaina, Battenhausen, Bockendorf, Dodenhausen, Haddenberg, Haina (administrative seat), Halgehausen, Hüttenrode, Löhlbach, Mohnhausen, Oberholzhausen and Römershausen.

History
The former Cistercian monastery in Haina is Hesse's most important Gothic building works. Haina Monastery was built by monks from the Altenberg Monastery in the Bergisches Land. In 1188, they had moved to the Aulesburg (castle) near Löhlbach, and thirty years later they moved again, this time to Haina.

Through donations, buying and exchanges, the Haina Cistercians earned themselves a rich estate, from the Weser all the way to the Main. In 1527, the monastery was shut down by Philip I, Landgrave of Hesse – known as Philip the Magnanimous – and turned into a state hospital.

The Monastery Church, built between 1215 and 1330, is the earliest Gothic building in Germany. The former monastery nowadays houses a psychiatric hospital.

In 1789, the Abbot of the Haina Monastery Friedrich von Stamford built the Stamfordscher Garten in Haina, and "English garden".

Politics

Municipal council
Haina's council is made up of 23 councillors, with seats apportioned thus, in accordance with municipal elections held on 15 June 2016

The SPD won the Municipal Election making Alexander Köhler the new Mayor

Note: Bürgergemeinschaft Großgemeinde Haina, Freie Bürgerschaft Löhlbach and Unabhängige Bürger Dodenhausen im Kellerwald are all citizens' coalitions.

Sons and daughters of the town
Anton Wilhelm Tischbein (♥ 1 March 1730, Haina - † 1 November 1804, Hanau), known as the Hanauer Tischbein, was a German painter
 Johann Anton Tischbein (♥ 28 August 1720, Haina -  † 26 July 1784, Hamburg) was a German painter and art teacher
 Johann Heinrich Tischbein the Elder, (♥ 3 October 1722, Haina – † 22 August 1789, Kassel), known as the Kasseler Tischbein, was one of the most respected European painters in the 18th century
 Johann Heinrich Tischbein the Younger (♥ 28 November 1742, Haina - † 22 December 1808, Kassel), was a German painter and engraver
 Johann Heinrich Wilhelm Tischbein (♥ 15 February 1751, Haina – † 26 February 1829, Eutin), known as the Goethe Tischbein, was a German painter
 Johann Jacob Tischbein (♥ 21 February 1725, Haina – † 22/23 August 1791, Lübeck), known as the Lübecker Tischbein, was a German painter

Reinhard Schenck zu Schweinsberg

Johann Klauer zu Wohra

Museums
Psychiatry museum
Tischbeinhaus

Further reading
 Die hessische Malerfamilie Tischbein. Verzeichnis ihrer Mitglieder und eine Auswahl ihrer Werke. Staatliche Kunstsammlungen, Hessisches Landesmuseum, Kassel 1934 (in German)

References

External links
Parish homepage with virtual monastery tour
Haina
Monastery history

Waldeck-Frankenberg